Hanin Maher Tamim (born 5 April 2000) is a Lebanese footballer who plays as a forward for American college team Lander Bearcats.

Club career 
Tamim began playing football at an early age at FC Beirut's boys academy. After playing football in her school team, she joined Beirut Football Academy (BFA), making her debut in the Lebanese Women's Football League.

Following three seasons at BFA, she moved to Stars Association for Sports (SAS) – the league reigning champions – in 2018. Tamim helped SAS to a second-place finish at the inaugural 2019 WAFF Women's Clubs Championship; she described it as her favourite international experience.

On 27 May 2022, Tamim signed for the Lander Bearcats, the football team of Lander University in the United States.

International career 
Tamin had represented Lebanon internationally at under-17 and under-19 level, before making her senior debut on 8 November 2018, in a 8–0 defeat to Iran in the 2020 Summer Olympics qualifiers. She scored her first goal on 7 January 2019, with Lebanon losing to Bahrain 3–2 in the 2019 WAFF Championship. Tamim scored three goals, and helped Lebanon finish in third place.

On 24 October 2021, Tamim scored a brace in a 2022 AFC Asian Cup qualification game against Guam, which ended in a 3–0 win.

Personal life 
Tamim majored in Nutrition and Dietetics at the American University of Beirut.

Career statistics

International
Scores and results list Lebanon's goal tally first, score column indicates score after each Tamim goal.

Honours 
SAS
 Lebanese Women's Football League: 2018–19, 2019–20, 2021–22
 Lebanese Women's FA Cup: 2018–19
 Lebanese Women's Super Cup: 2018
 WAFF Women's Clubs Championship runner-up: 2019

Lebanon U18
 WAFF U-18 Women's Championship runner-up: 2018

Lebanon U17
 Arab U-17 Women's Cup: 2015

Lebanon
 WAFF Women's Championship third place: 2019

See also
 List of Lebanon women's international footballers

References

External links

 

2000 births
Living people
Footballers from Beirut
Lebanese women's footballers
Women's association football forwards
Beirut Football Academy players
Stars Association for Sports players
Lander Bearcats women's soccer players
Lebanese Women's Football League players
Lebanon women's youth international footballers
Lebanon women's international footballers
Lebanese expatriate women's footballers
Lebanese expatriate sportspeople in the United States
Expatriate women's soccer players in the United States
American University of Beirut alumni